Senator Streeter may refer to:

Alson Streeter (1823–1901), Illinois State Senate
Farris B. Streeter (1819–1877), Pennsylvania State Senate